was a village located in Higashikamo District, east-central Aichi Prefecture, Japan.

As of April 1, 2004, the village had an estimated population of 5,593 and a population density of 48.9 persons per km². Its total area was 114.18 km².

Modern Shimoyama village was created on October 1, 1889.

On April 1, 2005, Shimoyama, along with the town of Fujioka, the village of Obara (both from Nishikamo District), and the towns of Asuke, Asahi, and Inabu (all from Higashikamo District), was merged into the expanded city of Toyota, and has ceased to exist as an independent municipality.

Dissolved municipalities of Aichi Prefecture
Toyota, Aichi